Philipp Bauknecht (1884, Barcelona - 26 February 1933, Davos) was a German Expressionist painter and graphic artist. Most of his works are landscapes and still-lifes.

Biography 
He was born in Barcelona, where his father was working as a watchmaker and goldsmith. In 1893, his family returned to their hometown of Schramberg. He later completed an apprenticeship at the carpentry school in Nürnberg, then attended the State Academy of Fine Arts Stuttgart where he studied with Bernhard Pankok. Upon graduating, he joined the school's staff.

The surroundings of the Swiss Alps and his illness inspired him to create works dealing with mountains, landscapes, villages, ice skating, hiking, rural life, illness and death.

Even though his health improved, he refused to return to Germany, as he was opposed to the war. He apparently lived very poorly, in a log cabin, and the proceeds from his first exhibition were seized to pay off debts. During this time, he became severely misanthropic; satirizing the people of Davos and the guests who came there to visit the spa. In 1917, one of those guests was the famous artist, Ernst Ludwig Kirchner. At first, they were friends, but slowly became enemies. Bauknecht accused him of being unable to paint unless he was drunk and rejected the idea that Kirchner had influenced him.

After 1920, until his death, he exhibited his paintings and woodcuts widely throughout Switzerland and Germany. In 1925, he married the wealthy Ada van Blommestein, from the Netherlands, and travelled with her there. They had one son. Although he was now financially secure, his health began to deteriorate, so he returned to Davos and died there in 1933, while having an operation for gastric cancer. Ada took his remaining works to Baarn, in the Netherlands, and hid them from the Nazis. In Germany, his paintings were declared "degenerate art" and some were displayed at the Degenerate Art Exhibition in Munich in 1937. Most of his work there was eventually destroyed or lost. It wasn't until 1960 that his works were rediscovered and reevaluated.

Selected paintings

References

Further reading 
 Paul Pieper, Rudolf Utzinger: Philipp Bauknecht: Gemälde, Aquarelle, Holzschnitte. Münster: Freie Künstlergemeinschaft "Schanze", 1963.
 Gioia Smid (Ed.): Philipp Bauknecht: Expressionist in Davos, 1884 – 1933. Bussum 2002. .
 Beat Stutzer (Ed.): Expressionismus aus den Bergen. Ernst Ludwig Kirchner, Philipp Bauknecht, Jan Wiegers und die Gruppe Rot-Blau. Zürich: Scheidegger und Spiess, 2007. .
 Sylvia Laun, Phillip Bauknecht (1884–1933), Leben und Werk. Europäische Hochschulschriften, Frankfurt am Main 1992, Peter Lang, 
 Thorsten Sadowsky; Beat Stutzer: Phillip Bauknecht (1884–1933) (exhibition catalog), Swiridoff, Künzelsau 2014,

External links 

 Bauknecht. Im Versteck. Malerei. In: Der Spiegel 34/1961 vom 16. August 1961
 More works by Bauknecht @ ArtNet
 Philipp Bauknecht wird mit Retrospektive geehrt. In: Die Welt vom 8. April 2014
 

1884 births
1933 deaths
20th-century German painters
20th-century German male artists
German landscape painters
German still life painters
German Expressionist painters
German emigrants to Switzerland